David Graham Drummond Ogilvy, 10th and 5th Earl of Airlie,  (4 May 1826 – 25 September 1881), styled Lord Ogilvy from birth until 1849, was a Scottish peer and soldier.

Background and education
He was the oldest son of David Ogilvy, 9th Earl of Airlie, and his first wife, Clementina, daughter of Gavin Drummond. Ogilvy was educated at Christ Church, Oxford, where he graduated with a Bachelor of Arts in 1847. Two years later, he succeeded his father as earl. In 1879, Ogilvy received an Honorary Doctorate of Laws by the University of Glasgow.

Career
Ogilvy became a Deputy Lieutenant for Forfarshire in 1847. He was elected a representative peer to the House of Lords in 1850 and served as captain of the Forfarshire Yeomanry Cavalry and the 12th Forfarshire Rifle Volunteers from 1856. Ogilvy was invested as a Knight of the Order of the Thistle in 1862. In 1872, he was appointed Lord High Commissioner to the General Assembly of the Church of Scotland, an office he held until the following year.

Family and death
On 23 September 1851, he married (Henrietta) Blanche (30 July 1830 – 5 January 1921), second daughter of Edward Stanley, 2nd Baron Stanley of Alderley, and his wife, Henrietta, at Alderley, Cheshire, and had by her two sons and four daughters. Ogilvy died in Denver, Colorado, in 1881 and was succeeded in his titles by his older son, David.
 Lady (Henrietta) Blanche Ogilvy (8 November 1852 – 23 March 1925); married on 28 September 1873 Colonel Sir Henry Montague Hozier and had issue, including Clementine Ogilvy Hozier (who in 1908 became the wife of Winston Churchill) and Nellie Hozier (the mother of the British socialist Esmond Romilly and the journalist Giles Romilly). 
 Lady Clementina Gertrude Helen Ogilvy (19 June 1854 – 30 April 1932); married 31 December 1874 Algernon Freeman-Mitford, 1st Baron Redesdale; they were the grandparents of the Mitford sisters, including Nancy, who edited the letters of the Stanley family, and Jessica, who married her second cousin Esmond Romilly (grandson of Lady Blanche Hozier).
 Lt.-Col. David Stanley William Ogilvy, 11th (or 6th) Earl of Airlie (20 January 1856 – 11 June 1900, killed in action in the Boer War); married Lady Mabell Gore, and had issue. They were grandparents of Angus Ogilvy, who married Princess Alexandra of Kent.
 Lady Maude Josepha Ogilvy (16 November 1859 – 3 April 1933); married on 12 October 1886 Theodore George Willan Whyte, and had issue.
 Lyulph Gilchrist Stanley Ogilvy (25 June 1861 – April 1947); he married 27 August 1902 Edith Gertrude Boothroyd, in Colorado, USA, and had issue.
 Lady Griselda Johanna Helen Ogilvy (20 December 1865 – 12 February 1934); married on 22 December 1897 James Cheape, and had issue.

See also 
 Airlie, Oregon

References

1826 births
1881 deaths
Alumni of Christ Church, Oxford
Deputy Lieutenants of Forfarshire
Earls of Airlie
Knights of the Thistle
Scottish representative peers
Fife and Forfar Yeomanry officers